The Institutional Security Bureau (GSI; English: Institutional Security Bureau of the Presidency of the Republic, ISB) is an executive cabinet office of the federal government of Brazil responsible for providing direct assistance at a moment's notice to the President on matters of national security and defense policy. It is currently headed by retired Army General Gonçalves Dias.

Responsibilities
 Assist the President directly in the performance of their duties;
 Prevent the occurrence of serious and imminent threats to institutional stability;
 Organize crisis management response to a threat to national and institutional stability;
 Provide personal advice on military and security issues;
 Coordinate federal intelligence activities and information security;
 Ensure the personal security of the President, the Vice-President of the Republic and their families and, where determined by the President of the Republic, the holders of the essential organs of the Presidency and other authorities and personalities, having received law enforcement powers for this purpose;
 Serve as the central government organ which oversees and organizes the Brazilian Nuclear Program Protection System;
 Provide planning and coordination to events which the President is expected to attend both and home and, with the assistance of the Ministry of Foreign Affairs, also abroad;
 Provide assistance to activities pertaining to the Brazilian Aerospace Sector;
 Provide assistance to activities pertaining to terrorism and the actions necessary to prevent and neutralize it, providing subsidies when necessary.

History

Created by Provisional Measure (MP) No. 1911-10 of 24 September 1999 by President Fernando Henrique Cardoso.

The existence of a body responsible for institutional security is not new in Brazilian history, having been the responsibility of multiple government agencies prior to the creation of the Institutional Security Bureau:

 1930 – 1934: General Staff of the Provisional Government
 1934 – 1938: General Staff of the Government
 1938 – 1992: Military Office
 1992 – 1999: Ministry of Defence
 1999 – 2015 (temporarily deactivated): Institutional Security Bureau 
 2016 (re-activated by President Michel Temer): Institutional Security Bureau

References

Government ministries of Brazil
Ministries established in 1999
1999 establishments in Brazil